Strigivenifera bartschi is a species of moths in the genus Strigivenifera. It is in the family Limacodidae.

Distribution 
Strigivenifera bartschi occurs in Kenya and Uganda.

References 

Chrysopolominae
Moths described in 2013
Insects of Kenya
Insects of Uganda